The 5th (Mhow) Cavalry Brigade was a cavalry brigade of the British Indian Army that saw active service in the Indian Army during the First World War.  Formed in November 1914, it served on the Western Front as part of the 2nd and 1st Indian Cavalry Divisions until it was broken up in March 1918.

History
Uniquely amongst the six Indian cavalry brigades sent to the Western Front in the First World War, the 5th (Mhow) Cavalry Brigade was not a pre war formation.  The brigade was formed on 11 November 1914 from units in 5th (Mhow) Division and the 6th (Inniskilling) Dragoons from Muttra.

In company with the 7th (Meerut) Cavalry Brigade, it departed Bombay on 19 November 1914 and landed at Marseilles on 14–16 December.  It joined the 2nd Indian Cavalry Division which was formally constituted on 14 December.  The division concentrated around Orléans on 20–24 December and moved up to the Front on 1–4 January 1915.  While in France, the brigade was known by its geographical rather than numerical designation so as to avoid confusion with the British 5th Cavalry Brigade also serving on the Western Front at the same time.

On 15 September 1915, the brigade swapped places with the 3rd (Ambala) Cavalry Brigade of 1st Indian Cavalry Division.

Other than the Battle of Cambrai when it helped to hold the German counter-attack, it was not involved in battle. Instead, it was held in reserve in case of a breakthrough, although it did send parties to the trenches on a number of occasions. They would hold the line, or act as Pioneers; such parties were designated as the Mhow Battalion.

On 1 December 1917, Lance-Daffadar Gobind Singh of the 28th Light Cavalry, attached to 2nd Lancers (Gardner's Horse), won the Victoria Cross during the Battle of Cambrai.

Dissolved
In March 1918, the brigade was broken up in France. The British units (6th (Inniskilling) Dragoons and A Battery, Royal Horse Artillery) remained in France, 11th Machine Gun Squadron was broken up on 14 April 1918 and the Indian elements were sent to Egypt.  On 24 April 1918, these were merged with the 6th Mounted Brigade of the Yeomanry Mounted Division. On 22 July 1918 the 6th Mounted Brigade was redesignated as 10th Cavalry Brigade and the division as 4th Cavalry Division.

Order of battle
The 5th (Mhow) Cavalry Brigade commanded the following units on the Western Front:
 6th (Inniskilling) Dragoons (joined from Muttra, 7th (Meerut) Division)
 2nd Lancers (Gardner's Horse) (joined from Jubbulpore, 5th (Mhow) Division)
 38th King George's Own Central India Horse (joined from Jhansi, 5th (Mhow) Division)
 X Battery, Royal Horse Artillery (joined in December 1914 from XIII Brigade, Royal Horse Artillery at Mhow, 5th (Mhow) Division; transferred on 15 September 1915 to 3rd (Ambala) Cavalry Brigade when the brigades swapped places)
 A Battery, Royal Horse Artillery (joined on 15 September 1915 from 3rd (Ambala) Cavalry Brigade)
 Signal Troop
 11th Machine Gun Squadron (from 29 February 1916)

Commanders
The 5th (Mhow) Cavalry Brigade had the following commanders:

Notes

See also

 4th (Secunderabad) Cavalry Brigade was designated as 5th Indian Cavalry Brigade from September 1920 to 1923
 Indian Cavalry Corps order of battle First World War
 Indian Expeditionary Force A

References

Bibliography

External links
 
 

C05
Cavalry brigades of the British Indian Army
Military units and formations established in 1914
Military units and formations disestablished in 1918
Mhow